Dr Prem Jain (January 1936 – September 2018) was an Indian  mechanical engineer, also known as the Father of Green Buildings in India. Jain served as the chairman of Indian Green Building Council (IGBC).

Early life and education 
Prem Jain did his BSC ME from IT BHU in 1952 and obtained a PhD from University of Minnesota in 1967. He studied further to receive a master's degree from University of Minnesota in 1970 and then a PhD in 1972 from the same institute. After returning to India, he was a visiting professor at IIT Kanpur. During his tenure, he set up a separate laboratory for Environmental Engineering. Jain was also on the faculty at School of Planning and Architecture Delhi.

Career 
He worked with Carrier Corp R&D USA and then with Stein Doshi Bhalla, an architectural firm. During his tenure with this firm, Jain worked for the design of IIC expansion, Ford Foundation & UNICEF (WWF) buildings on Lodhi Road, Zakir Hussain Memorial in Okhla, Escorts Factory Building in Faridabad and Expansion of Triveni Kala Sangam in New Delhi. In 1980 Jain founded Spectral Services Consultants Private Limited (now an AECOM company) to provide Mechanical, Electrical & Plumbing (MEP)  designs. During his work at Spectral, he did several notable projects including:

Rashtrapati Bhawan Darbar Hall
 Prime Minister's Office.
Vigyan Bhawan & AIIMS New Delhi (Renovation after Fire)
Bahaii Temple (Lotus Temple) Extension New Delhi
Siddhi Vinayak Temple Mumbai
 MoEF Headquarter Building 
 Indira Pariyavaran Bhawan, New Delhi

Awards and recognition 

 First practicing engineer in India to have been nominated in 1995 as Fellow of the Ashrae, USA
Distinguished Leadership for Internationals Award by University of Minnesota

Prem Jain Memorial Trust 
Prem Jain died aged 82 on 20 September 2018 in Delhi. A trust called Prem Jain Memorial Trust was founded.

References 

1936 births
Indian business executives
2018 deaths
University of Minnesota alumni
Rensselaer Polytechnic Institute alumni
Indian environmentalists